Tommy Robredo was the defending champion, but he chose to compete in the 2010 ABN AMRO World Tennis Tournament instead.
Juan Carlos Ferrero won in the final 6–1, 6–0 against Łukasz Kubot.

Seeds

Draw

Finals

Top half

Bottom half

Qualifying

Seeds

Qualifiers

Lucky loser

Draw

First qualifier

Second qualifier

Third qualifier

Fourth qualifier

External links
Main Draw
Qualifying Draw

Singles